Saarela is a Finnish surname. Notable people with the surname include:

Aleksi Saarela (born 1997), Finnish ice hockey forward
Olli Saarela (born 1965), Finnish film director
Pasi Saarela (born 1973), Finnish ice hockey player
Samuli Saarela (born 1988), Finnish mountain bike orienteering competitor
Yrjö Saarela (1884–1951), Finnish wrestler

Finnish-language surnames